Hemimeris is a genus of flowering plants in the family Scrophulariaceae, native to the Cape Provinces of South Africa. They secrete oils to attract specialized oil-collecting bees from the genus Rediviva.

Species
, the following species were accepted:

Hemimeris centrodes Hiern
Hemimeris gracilis Schltr.
Hemimeris montana L.f.
Hemimeris racemosa (Houtt.) Merr.
Hemimeris sabulosa L.f.

References

Scrophulariaceae
Scrophulariaceae genera
Endemic flora of South Africa